Nathalie Tauziat was the defending champion, but lost in semifinals to Elena Likhovtseva.

Kim Clijsters won the title by defeating Elena Likhovtseva 7–6(8–6), 4–6, 6–4 in the final.

Seeds
The first four seeds received a bye into the second round.

Draw

Finals

Top half

Bottom half

External links
 Official Results Archive (ITF)
 Official Results Archive (WTA)

Singles 2000
2000 WTA Tour